Johann Voldemar Jannsen ( in Vändra, Kreis Pernau, Livonia, Russian Empire – , in Tartu) was an Estonian journalist and poet active in Livonia.

He wrote the words of the patriotic song "Mu isamaa, mu õnn ja rõõm", which later became the national anthem of Estonia. He was the father of the poet Lydia Koidula. As the leader of the choral society which organised the first nationwide Song Festival in Tartu in 1869, Jannsen played a crucial role in the Estonian National Awakening.

References 

1819 births
1890 deaths
People from Vändra
People from Kreis Pernau
Estonian journalists
Estonian male poets
National anthem writers
19th-century Estonian poets
19th-century journalists
Male journalists
19th-century male writers
Burials at Raadi cemetery